State Trunk Highway 67 (often called Highway 67, STH-67 or WIS 67) is a Wisconsin state highway running from the Wisconsin–Illinois state line east of Beloit north to U.S. Highway 151 (US 151) east of Chilton.

WIS 67 meanders through much of Southeastern Wisconsin, passing through both the northern and southern units of the Kettle Moraine State Forest. It ends just south of the Killsnake State Wildlife Area in Manitowoc County.

Route description
The southern end of WIS 67 is located on the far east side of Beloit at the Wisconsin–Illinois state line just east of Interstate 90/Interstate 39 (I-90/I-39) where it becomes Illinois Route 75 (IL 75). IL 75 continues westward to South Beloit and Freeport, Illinois.

The northern terminus of the route is at U.S. Highway 151 outside of Chilton, west-southwest of Valders

WIS 67 passes by Old World Wisconsin in Eagle, a "living" outdoor museum run by the State Historical Society of Wisconsin. It also passes Road America in Elkhart Lake; Road America has been the host of many international racing events, from motorcycle to sports car to IndyCar races on its  road course.

History
Initially, WIS 67 traveled from WIS 23 in Plymouth to WIS 48 (now WIS 32/WIS 57) in New Holstein via parts of its present-day routing and present-day CTH-J. In 1920, WIS 67 was superseded by WIS 57's northern extension. As a result, it moved onto another part of its present-day route. The new route traveled from WIS 59/WIS 99 (now just WIS 59) in Eagle to WIS 26 (now WIS 28) in Mayville. In 1924, WIS 67 was extended from both ends. At its northern end, WIS 67 extended northeast to WIS 23 in Plymouth, its former route's southern terminus. At its southern end, WIS 67 extended south via the former southernmost portion of WIS 59. This is because WIS 59 diverged westward from Eagle and extended towards Monroe.

In 1947, WIS 67 extended south via US 12 and former CTH-H to WIS 36 (part of it is now Geneva Street) in Williams Bay. In 1956, part of WIS 57 moved eastward away from Plymouth. As a result, WIS 67 extended northward to WIS 32/WIS 57 in Kiel via WIS 57's former portion. This extension restored the southern half of WIS 67's oldest alignment. Around 1968, WIS 67 extended southwest to US 14 in Walworth, superseding part of WIS 36 in the process. Around 1979, WIS 67 extended southward via US 14 and then westward along CTH-W to WIS 140 north of the Illinois state line.

Major intersections

See also

References

External links

Oconomowoc Bypass Project page from Wisconsin Department of Transportation
Old World Wisconsin from Wisconsin Historical Society

067
Transportation in Rock County, Wisconsin
Transportation in Walworth County, Wisconsin
Transportation in Waukesha County, Wisconsin
Transportation in Dodge County, Wisconsin
Transportation in Fond du Lac County, Wisconsin
Transportation in Sheboygan County, Wisconsin
Transportation in Manitowoc County, Wisconsin